The Masson-Angers District (District 18) is a municipal district in the city of Gatineau, Quebec. It is represented on Gatineau City Council by Mario Aubé.

The district is located in the Masson-Angers sector of the city, and is the sector's only district. The district includes the communities of Masson and Angers.

Councillors
Luc Montreuil (2001-2013)
Marc Carrière (2013–2021)
Mario Aubé (2021–present)

Election results

2021

2017

2013

2009

2005

2001

References

Districts of Gatineau